Gideon John Davies (born 6 July 1964)  is a Professor of Chemistry in the Structural Biology Laboratory (YSBL) at the University of York, UK.  Davies is best known for his ground-breaking studies into carbohydrate-active enzymes, notably analysing the conformational and mechanistic basis for catalysis and applying this for societal benefit.  In 2016 Davies was apppointed the Royal Society Ken Murray Research Professor at the University of York.

Education
Davies was educated at the University of Bristol where he was awarded a Bachelor of Science degree in Biochemistry and a PhD in 1990 for research on the enzyme phosphoglycerate kinase isolated from the bacterium Bacillus stearothermophilus, and supervised by Herman Watson and Len Hall.  He was awarded a Doctor of Science (DSc) degree from the University of Bristol in 2007.

Career 
Following his PhD, Davies did postdoctoral research at the European Molecular Biology Laboratory (EMBL) outstation in Hamburg working with Keith S. Wilson on the use of synchrotron radiation in protein crystallography and also at the French National Centre for Scientific Research (CNRS) in Grenoble. in 1990, Davies moved to York to work with Dale Wigley and Guy Dodson on DNA gyrase, starting his own group within YSBL in 1996 upon receiving a Royal Society University Research Fellowship. He was appointed Professor at the University of York in 2001 and awarded a Royal Society Ken Murray Research Professorship in 2016. He has collaborated with Alywn Jones, Bernard Henrissat, Steve Withers and David Vocadlo. Among those who undertook doctoral research with him are Tracey Gloster.

Research
Davies research investigates the biological chemistry of carbohydrates, from their structure to their roles in enzymology, glycobiology, use as biofuels and implications for gut microbiota. His research  has been funded by the Biotechnology and Biological Sciences Research Council (BBSRC), European Research Council (ERC) and Alzheimer's Research UK.

Davies has over 340 publications in peer reviewed journals.

Awards and honours
Davies has won a number of awards for his work.  These include The Davy Medal and Gabor Medal of the Royal Society, the John and Rita Cornforth Award (with Paul Walton), the Haworth Memorial, Khorana, Peptide and Protein, Corday-Morgan and Carbohydrate Chemistry medals of the Royal Society of Chemistry, the iChemE Global Energy Award of the Institution of Chemical Engineers (with Paul Walton and Bernard Henrissat), The Whistler Prize of the International Carbohydrate Organization, and the GlaxoSmithKline Award of the Biochemical Society. In 2019 he was one of the members of the York Structural Biology Laboratory at the University of York that received the Queen's Anniversary Prize.

Davies was elected a member of the European Molecular Biology Organization (EMBO) in 2010 and is a Fellow of the Royal Society of Chemistry (FRSC)

In 2010, Davies was elected a Fellow of the Royal Society (FRS). His nomination reads: 

Davies was elected a Fellow of the Academy of Medical Sciences (FMedSci) in 2014, his nomination reads

He was awarded the John and Rita Cornforth Award of Royal Society of Chemistry in 2020 and the Queen's Anniversary Prize (to YSBL)  in 2019 He was a Haworth Memorial Lectureship of Royal Society of Chemistry in 2018 and a Global Energy Award of Institution of Chemical Engineers winner in 2016.

Personal life
Davies married Valérie Marie-Andrée Ducros in 1999 (div. 2021) and has two daughters.

References

Living people
Fellows of the Royal Society
Fellows of the Academy of Medical Sciences (United Kingdom)
Academics of the University of York
Members of the European Molecular Biology Organization
Fellows of the Royal Society of Chemistry
1964 births
British biochemists
Biophysicists